Luis Omar Lara Mendoza (June 9, 1941 – July 2, 2021) was a Chilean poet, translator, and editor.

Awards
 2007, Premio Casa de América de Poesía Americana

References

1941 births
2021 deaths
Chilean male poets
Chilean translators
Austral University of Chile alumni
People from Nueva Imperial